Balthazar Martinot (1636–1714) was a French clockmaker, and valet de chambre of the Queen and the King.

His daughter Anne Martinot married the king's goldsmith Philippe Van Dievoet.

He was considered  to be one of the most famous clockmakers in Europe of his time. He made clocks for both home market as well as the Far Eastern market. The Most Designs came from André-Charles Boulle (1642-1732). 

'He was born in Rouen, the son of Balthazar Martinot I (1610–1697), Gouverneur du Gros Horloge at Rouen. His brothers, Claude (1637-after 1697), Etienne (1639–1702) and Gilles (1658–1726) were also clockmakers of repute and in turn Martinot II sired Balthazar-Louis Martinot, who became Ecuyer, Valet de la Garde-Robe du Roi. Unlike his father, Balthazar Martinot worked in Paris from circa 1660, where he was established at rue Galande in 1683 and Quai des Orfèvres in 1697. He retired to Saint-Germain-en-Laye in 1710, where he died a few years later. His talent aroused important patronage and gained great prestige. In 1665 he succeeded his father-in-law, Pierre Belon, as Valet de Chambre-Horloger Ordinaire de la Reine, Anne of Austria. He was later appointed Horloger Ordinaire du Conseil du Roi. Garde-Visiteur, 1678–79 and 1693-95. He was patronized by the most influential members of society including Louis XIV, the Grand Dauphin, the Ducs d’Aumont and de La Trémoille, the Prince de Rohan, the Marquis d’Argenson, the Comtesse de Polignac, the Cardinal de Gesvres, the Présidents du Harlay, de Lamoignon, de Maison and many others. He also sold several clocks to the King of Siam in 1685 and supplied a number to Constantinople. An inventory of 1700 revealed that he held the largest stock of clocks in Paris, while five years previously he had organized a significant lottery in association with his colleague, Nicholas Gribelin.

His clocks were not only of the very finest quality but were also housed in exceptionally beautiful cases; notably those made by Jean-Michel Ziegler and André-Charles Boulle. His works are now installed in some of the world’s finest collections including the Musée du Louvre, Musée de Cluny and Musée National des Techniques, Paris; the Musée des Arts Décoratifs, Lyons; Musée de Saint-Pierre; Musée de Pau and Château de Champs; the Museum der Zeitmessung Beyer, Zurich; Musée d’Horlogerie de La Chaux-de-Fonds; the Mathematisch-Physikalischer Salon, Dresden; the Victoria and Albert Museum, London and the Museum of Art, Cleveland, Ohio.'

The Clock of Brasília Palácio do Planalto was destroyed, during the Invasion of the Brazilian Congress on the 8th of January, 2023.
This Clock had been won by Prince Joseph of Brazil on his wedding in 1729. At that time the courts enjoyed collecting clocks and giving them as gifts.The Clock had been given as a wedding gift by King Louis XIV of France to Dom João VI and taken to Brazil in 1808 along with the Portuguese royal family. The criminal destroyer Antônio Cláudio Alves Ferreira was arrested.

Bibliography
Hélène Cavalié née d'Escayrac-Lauture, Pierre Germain dit le Romain (1703-1783). Vie d'un orfèvre et de son entourage, Paris, 2007, thèse de l'École des Chartes, tome I, pp. 209, 210, 345, 350, 429, 447. (Concerning the goldsmiths Vandive).
Mathieu da Vinha, Les valets de chambre de Louis XIV, Paris, Perrin, 2004.
Tardy, Dictionnaire des horlogers français, Paris, 1971, sub verbo MARTINOT.
Bulletin de la Commission des antiquités de la Seine-Inférieure, Imprimerie H. Boissel, 1897, Tome 10 (1894/96), p. 425, over Balthazar Martinot.
Mémoires de la Société académique d'agriculture, des sciences, arts et belles-lettres du département de l'Aube, Société académique d'agriculture, des sciences, arts et belles-lettres du département de l'Aube, p. 185.
ALBILLO, Ana José Braña. EL TIEMPO DE LOS BORBONES ARTE DE LA RELOJERÍA EN LAS COLECCIONES REALES DE FELIPE V A FERNANDO VII. Universidad de Valladolid: 2016, España.

Notes

French clockmakers
1636 births
1714 deaths
Material culture of royal courts